Robert Ochterlony was Dean of Brechin during the 1720s (in 1727).

Notes

Scottish Episcopalian clergy
Deans of Brechin